David Morton Rayside  (born 1947) is a Canadian academic and activist. He was a professor of political science at the University of Toronto until his retirement in 2013, and was the founding director of the university's Mark S. Bonham Centre for Sexual Diversity Studies from 2004 to 2008.

Rayside joined the University of Toronto in 1974, and for forty years taught and wrote on the politics of sexual diversity, gender, and religion. He was a member of the Right to Privacy Committee, a committee formed in response to police raids on gay bathhouses, The Body Politic, one of Canada's first and most influential LGBT magazines, the Citizens' Independent Review of Police Activities, and the campaign to add sexual orientation to the Ontario Human Rights Code. He was also a cofounder of the Canadian Lesbian and Gay Studies Association, and of the Positive Space Campaign at the University of Toronto.

He has served on the boards of the Canadian Political Science Association and the American Political Science Association, and in both organizations he worked on committees promoting equity in academic life.  In 2014 he was elected a fellow of the Royal Society of Canada.  In 2019, he was inducted into the National Portrait Collection of The ArQuives: Canada's LGBTQ2+ Archives.

In recent years he has focused his writing on the history of a small eastern Ontario community in Glengarry County.  Out of this has come a biography of Edith Rayside, a great aunt who distinguished herself as a leader of Canadian military nurses in the First World War.  Other essays use stories about South Lancaster as vehicles for exploring larger themes in Canadian social and political history.

Publications
 A Small Town in Modern Times: Alexandria, Ontario, 1991
 On the Fringe: Gays and Lesbians in Politics, 1998
 Equity, Diversity, and Canadian Labour, ed. Gerald Hunt and David Rayside, 2007 
 Queer Inclusions, Continental Divisions: Public Recognition of Sexual Diversity in Canada and the United States, 2008 Faith, Politics, and Sexual Diversity in Canada and the United States, ed. David Rayside and Clyde Wilcox, 2011
 Conservatism in Canada, ed. James Farney and David Rayside, 2013
 Religion and Canadian Party Politics, by David Rayside, Jerald Sabin, and Paul E. J. Thomas, 2017
 "Early Advocacy for the Public Recognition of Sexual Diversity," in The Oxford Handbook of Global LGBT and Sexual Diversity Politics, ed. Michael Bosia, Sandra McEvoy, and Momin Rahman (ISBN 9780190673741) 2020.

References

External links

 
 David Rayside archival papers held at the University of Toronto Archives and Records Management Services

1947 births
Academics from Montreal
Activists from Montreal
Activists from Toronto
Canadian political scientists
Canadian sociologists
Carleton University alumni
Gay academics
Canadian gay writers
Living people
University of Michigan alumni
Academic staff of the University of Toronto
Writers from Montreal
Writers from Toronto
21st-century Canadian LGBT people
Canadian LGBT academics